The William Peter Webb House is a historic house in Eutaw, Alabama.  The two-story wood-frame house was built c. 1840.  It is an I-house, with a Greek Revival-style distyle portico and other details added sometime later in the mid-19th century.  It was added to the National Register of Historic Places as part of the Antebellum Homes in Eutaw Thematic Resource on April 2, 1982.

References

National Register of Historic Places in Greene County, Alabama
Houses on the National Register of Historic Places in Alabama
Houses in Greene County, Alabama
Houses completed in 1840
I-houses in Alabama
Greek Revival houses in Alabama